Montelimar Airport (Spanish: Aeropuerto Montelimar)  is an airport serving the municipality of San Rafael del Sur, Nicaragua.

The airport is on the Pacific coast. Southwest approach and departure are over the water. The runway length includes displaced thresholds on both ends.

History
The airfield is next to the Barceló Montelimar Hotel and Resort. The current location of the hotel is the old Somoza Estate, confiscated by the government in 1979 and sold to the Spanish hotel chain Grupo Barceló(es) in 1993 for US$3 million.

In 2012, the government of Nicaragua and representatives of Grupo Barceló announced a joint venture to build an international airport at the Hotel Barceló Montelimar. The new airport will be 75 percent owned by the government and 25 percent owned by Grupo Barceló.

Airlines and destinations

The airport currently services only charter flights by airline Avianca Nicaragua to Managua. The terminal operates during daytime only.

See also

 List of airports in Nicaragua
 Transport in Nicaragua

References

External links
OpenStreetMap - Montelimar Airport
OurAirports - Montelimar Airport
Barceló Montelimar Hotel

Airports in Nicaragua
Managua Department